Euphorbiaceae, the spurge family, is a large family of flowering plants (anthophytes) in the order Malpighiales. In common English, they are sometimes called euphorbias, which is also the name of a genus in the family. Most spurges are herbs, but some, especially in the tropics, are shrubs or trees. Some are succulent and resemble cacti because of convergent evolution.

23,420 species of vascular plant have been recorded in South Africa, making it the sixth most species-rich country in the world and the most species-rich country on the African continent. Of these, 153 species are considered to be threatened. Nine biomes have been described in South Africa: Fynbos, Succulent Karoo, desert, Nama Karoo, grassland, savanna, Albany thickets, the Indian Ocean coastal belt, and forests.

The 2018 South African National Biodiversity Institute's National Biodiversity Assessment plant checklist lists 35,130 taxa in the phyla Anthocerotophyta (hornworts (6)), Anthophyta (flowering plants (33534)), Bryophyta (mosses (685)), Cycadophyta (cycads (42)), Lycopodiophyta (Lycophytes(45)), Marchantiophyta (liverworts (376)), Pinophyta (conifers (33)), and Pteridophyta (cryptogams (408)).

47 genera are represented in the literature. Listed taxa include species, subspecies, varieties, and forms as recorded, some of which have subsequently been allocated to other taxa as synonyms, in which cases the accepted taxon is appended to the listing. Multiple entries under alternative names reflect taxonomic revision over time.

Acalypha 
Genus Acalypha:
 Acalypha angustata Sond. indigenous
 Acalypha capensis (L.f.) Prain & Hutch. indigenous
 Acalypha caperonioides Baill. indigenous
 Acalypha caperonioides Baill. var. caperonioides, indigenous
 Acalypha caperonioides Baill. var. galpinii Prain, indigenous
 Acalypha ciliata Forssk. indigenous
 Acalypha depressinerva (Kuntze) K.Schum. indigenous
 Acalypha ecklonii Baill. endemic
 Acalypha fimbriata Schumach. & Thonn. indigenous
 Acalypha glabrata Thunb. indigenous
 Acalypha glabrata Thunb. var. glabrata, indigenous
 Acalypha glabrata Thunb. var. pilosa Pax, indigenous
 Acalypha glabrata Thunb. var. pilosior (Kuntze) Prain, accepted as Acalypha glabrata Thunb. var. pilosa Pax, present
 Acalypha glandulifolia Buchinger ex Meisn. indigenous
 Acalypha indica L. indigenous
 Acalypha indica L. var. indica, indigenous
 Acalypha ornata Hochst. ex A.Rich. indigenous
 Acalypha peduncularis E.Mey. ex Meisn. indigenous
 Acalypha pubiflora Baill. indigenous
 Acalypha pubiflora Baill. subsp. pubiflora, indigenous
 Acalypha punctata Meisn. indigenous
 Acalypha punctata Meisn. var. punctata, indigenous
 Acalypha punctata Meisn. var. rogersii Prain, indigenous
 Acalypha schinzii Pax, accepted as Acalypha depressinerva (Kuntze) K.Schum. present
 Acalypha segetalis Mull.Arg. indigenous
 Acalypha sonderiana Mull.Arg. indigenous
 Acalypha villicaulis Hochst. indigenous
 Acalypha wilmsii Pax ex Prain & Hutch. indigenous
 Acalypha zeyheri Baill. accepted as Acalypha peduncularis E.Mey. ex Meisn. present

Adenocline 
Genus Adenocline:
 Adenocline acuta (Thunb.) Baill. indigenous
 Adenocline pauciflora Turcz. endemic
 Adenocline violifolia (Kuntze) Prain, endemic

Alchornea 
Genus Alchornea:
 Alchornea hirtella Benth. indigenous
 Alchornea hirtella Benth. forma glabrata (Mull.Arg.) Pax & K.Hoffm. indigenous
 Alchornea laxiflora (Benth.) Pax & K.Hoffm. indigenous

Aleurites 
Genus Aleurites:
 Aleurites moluccana (L.) Willd. not indigenous, naturalised
 Aleurites moluccana (L.) Willd. var. moluccana, not indigenous, naturalised

Anisophyllum 
Genus Anisophyllum:
 Anisophyllum inaequilaterum (Sond.) Klotzsch & Garcke, accepted as Euphorbia inaequilatera Sond. indigenous
 Anisophyllum mossambicense Klotzsch & Garcke, accepted as Euphorbia mossambicensis (Klotzsch & Garcke) Boiss. indigenous
 Anisophyllum mundii Klotzsch & Garcke, accepted as Euphorbia inaequilatera Sond. indigenous
 Anisophyllum setigerum E.Mey. ex Klotzsch & Garcke, accepted as Euphorbia inaequilatera Sond. indigenous
 Anisophyllum tettense Klotzsch & Garcke, accepted as Euphorbia tettensis Klotzsch, indigenous

Anthacantha 
Genus Anthacantha:
 Anthacantha desmetiana Lem. accepted as Euphorbia heptagona L. indigenous

Arthrothamnus 
Genus Arthrothamnus:
 Arthrothamnus bergii Klotzsch & Garcke, accepted as Euphorbia burmannii (Klotzsch ex Garcke) E.Mey. ex Boiss. indigenous
 Arthrothamnus brachiatus E.Mey. ex Klotzsch & Garcke, accepted as Euphorbia rhombifolia Boiss. indigenous
 Arthrothamnus burmanii Klotzsch & Garcke, accepted as Euphorbia burmannii (Klotzsch ex Garcke) E.Mey. ex Boiss. indigenous
 Arthrothamnus cymosa Klotzsch & Garcke, accepted as Euphorbia tenax Burch. indigenous
 Arthrothamnus densiflorus Klotzsch & Garcke, accepted as Euphorbia rhombifolia Boiss. indigenous
 Arthrothamnus ecklonii Klotzsch & Garcke, accepted as Euphorbia tenax Burch. indigenous
 Arthrothamnus scopiformis Klotzsch & Garcke, accepted as Euphorbia tenax Burch. indigenous

Breynia 
Genus Breynia:
 Breynia disticha J.R.Forst. & G.Forst. not indigenous, cultivated, naturalised, invasive

Caperonia 
Genus Caperonia:
 Caperonia stuhlmannii Pax, indigenous

Cavacoa 
Genus Cavacoa
 Cavacoa aurea (Cavaco) J.Leonard, indigenous

Cephalocroton 
Genus Cephalocroton:
 Cephalocroton mollis Klotzsch, indigenous

Chamaesyce 
Genus Chamaesyce:
 Chamaesyce glanduligera (Pax) Koutnik, accepted as Euphorbia glanduligera Pax, indigenous
 Chamaesyce hirta (L.) Millsp. accepted as Euphorbia indica Lam. present
 Chamaesyce hypericifolia (L.) Millsp. accepted as Euphorbia hypericifolia L. 
 Chamaesyce inaequilatera (Sond.) Sojak, accepted as Euphorbia inaequilatera Sond. present
 Chamaesyce livida (E.Mey. ex Boiss.) Koutnik, accepted as Euphorbia livida E.Mey. ex Boiss. indigenous
 Chamaesyce mossambicensis (Klotzsch & Garcke) Koutnik, accepted as Euphorbia mossambicensis (Klotzsch & Garcke) Boiss. indigenous
 Chamaesyce neopolycnemoides (Pax & K.Hoffm.) Koutnik, accepted as Euphorbia neopolycnemoides Pax & K.Hoffm. indigenous
 Chamaesyce prostrata (Aiton) Small, accepted as Euphorbia prostrata Aiton, not indigenous, naturalised
 Chamaesyce serpens (Kunth) Small, accepted as Euphorbia serpens Kunth, not indigenous, naturalised
 Chamaesyce tettensis (Klotzsch) Koutnik, accepted as Euphorbia tettensis Klotzsch, indigenous
 Chamaesyce zambesiana (Benth.) Koutnik, accepted as Euphorbia zambesiana Benth. var. zambesiana, indigenous

Chrozophora 
Genus Chrozophora:
 Chrozophora plicata (Vahl) A.Juss. ex Spreng. indigenous

Clutia 
Genus Clutia:
 Clutia abyssinica Jaub. & Spach, indigenous
 Clutia abyssinica Jaub. & Spach var. abyssinica, indigenous
 Clutia affinis Sond. indigenous
 Clutia africana Poir. endemic
 Clutia alaternoides L. indigenous
 Clutia alaternoides L. var. alaternoides, endemic
 Clutia alaternoides L. var. angustifolia E.Mey. ex Sond. endemic
 Clutia alaternoides L. var. brevifolia E.Mey. ex Sond. endemic
 Clutia alpina Prain, endemic
 Clutia brevifolia Sond. accepted as Clutia polifolia Jacq. present
 Clutia cordata Bernh. endemic
 Clutia daphnoides Lam. endemic
 Clutia disceptata Prain, endemic
 Clutia dregeana Scheele, endemic
 Clutia ericoides Thunb. indigenous
 Clutia ericoides Thunb. var. ericoides, endemic
 Clutia ericoides Thunb. var. pachyphylla Prain, endemic
 Clutia ericoides Thunb. var. tenuis Sond. endemic
 Clutia govaertsii Radcl.-Sm. endemic
 Clutia heterophylla Thunb. indigenous
 Clutia hirsuta (Sond.) Mull.Arg. indigenous
 Clutia hirsuta (Sond.) Mull.Arg. var. hirsuta, indigenous
 Clutia hirsuta (Sond.) Mull.Arg. var. robusta Prain, endemic
 Clutia imbricata E.Mey. ex Sond. endemic
 Clutia impedita Prain, endemic
 Clutia katharinae Pax, indigenous
 Clutia laxa Eckl. ex Sond. indigenous
 Clutia marginata E.Mey. ex Sond. endemic
 Clutia monticola S.Moore, indigenous
 Clutia monticola S.Moore var. monticola, indigenous
 Clutia nana Prain, indigenous
 Clutia natalensis Bernh. indigenous
 Clutia ovalis Sond. endemic
 Clutia platyphylla Pax & K.Hoffm. endemic
 Clutia polifolia Jacq. endemic
 Clutia polygonoides L. endemic
 Clutia pterogona Mull.Arg. endemic
 Clutia pubescens Thunb. endemic
 Clutia pulchella L. indigenous
 Clutia pulchella L. var. franksiae Prain, endemic
 Clutia pulchella L. var. obtusata Sond. indigenous
 Clutia pulchella L. var. pulchella, indigenous
 Clutia rubricaulis Eckl. ex Sond. endemic
 Clutia rubricaulis Eckl. ex Sond. var. grandifolia Prain, accepted as Clutia rubricaulis Eckl. ex Sond. present
 Clutia rubricaulis Eckl. ex Sond. var. microphylla Prain, accepted as Clutia rubricaulis Eckl. ex Sond. present
 Clutia rubricaulis Eckl. ex Sond. var. tenuifolia Prain, accepted as Clutia rubricaulis Eckl. ex Sond. present
 Clutia sericea Mull.Arg. endemic
 Clutia thunbergii Sond. indigenous
 Clutia tomentosa L. endemic
 Clutia vaccinioides (Pax & K.Hoffm.) Prain, accepted as Clutia govaertsii Radcl.-Sm. present
 Clutia virgata Pax & K.Hoffm. indigenous

Croton 
Genus Croton:
 Croton bonplandianus Baill. not indigenous, naturalised
 Croton gratissimus Burch. indigenous
 Croton gratissimus Burch. var. gratissimus, indigenous
 Croton gratissimus Burch. var. subgratissimus (Prain) Burtt Davy, indigenous
 Croton madandensis S.Moore, indigenous
 Croton megalobotrys Mull.Arg. indigenous
 Croton menyharthii Pax, indigenous
 Croton pseudopulchellus Pax, indigenous
 Croton rivularis Mull.Arg. endemic
 Croton setigerus Hook. not indigenous, naturalised, invasive
 Croton steenkampianus Gerstner, indigenous
 Croton sylvaticus Hochst. indigenous
 Croton zambesicus Mull.Arg. accepted as Croton gratissimus Burch. var. gratissimus, present

Ctenomeria 
Genus Ctenomeria:
 Ctenomeria capensis (Thunb.) Harv. ex Sond. accepted as Tragia capensis Thunb. indigenous
 Ctenomeria cordata Harv. accepted as Tragia capensis Thunb. indigenous

Dactylanthes 
Genus Dactylanthes:
 Dactylanthes anacantha (Aiton) Haw. accepted as Euphorbia tridentata Lam. 
 Dactylanthes globosa Haw. accepted as Euphorbia globosa (Haw.) Sims, indigenous
 Dactylanthes hamata Haw. accepted as Euphorbia hamata (Haw.) Sweet, indigenous
 Dactylanthes patula (Mill.) Haw. accepted as Euphorbia patula Mill. indigenous
 Dactylanthes tuberculata (Jacq.) Haw. accepted as Euphorbia caput-medusae L.

Dalechampia 
Genus Dalechampia:
 Dalechampia capensis A.Spreng. indigenous
 Dalechampia galpinii Pax, indigenous
 Dalechampia scandens L. indigenous
 Dalechampia scandens L. var. natalensis (Mull.Arg.) Pax & K.Hoffm. indigenous
 Dalechampia volubilis E.Mey. ex Baill. accepted as Dalechampia scandens L. var. natalensis (Mull.Arg.) Pax & K.Hoffm. present

Erythrococca 
Genus Erythrococca:
 Erythrococca berberidea Prain, indigenous
 Erythrococca menyharthii (Pax) Prain, indigenous
 Erythrococca natalensis Prain, indigenous
 Erythrococca trichogyne (Mull.Arg.) Prain, indigenous
 Erythrococca trichogyne (Mull.Arg.) Prain var. trichogyne, indigenous

Euphorbia 
Genus Euphorbia:
 Euphorbia aequoris N.E.Br. accepted as Euphorbia juttae Dinter, indigenous
 Euphorbia aeruginosa Schweick. indigenous
 Euphorbia aggregata A.Berger, endemic
 Euphorbia aggregata A.Berger var. alternicolor (N.E.Br.) A.C.White, R.A.Dyer & B.Sloane, accepted as Euphorbia ferox Marloth, endemic
 Euphorbia albanica N.E.Br. endemic
 Euphorbia albertensis N.E.Br. accepted as Euphorbia decepta N.E.Br. endemic
 Euphorbia albipollinifera L.C.Leach, endemic
 Euphorbia albovillosa Pax, accepted as Euphorbia gueinzii Boiss. indigenous
 Euphorbia alternicolor N.E.Br. accepted as Euphorbia ferox Marloth, indigenous
 Euphorbia amarifontana N.E.Br. accepted as Euphorbia rhombifolia Boiss. endemic
 Euphorbia anacantha Aiton, accepted as Euphorbia tridentata Lam. 
 Euphorbia angrae N.E.Br. indigenous
 Euphorbia anoplia Stapf, endemic
 Euphorbia arabica Steud. & Hochst. ex Boiss. var. latiappendiculata Pax, accepted as Euphorbia neopolycnemoides Pax & K.Hoffm. indigenous
 Euphorbia arceuthobioides Boiss. accepted as Euphorbia tenax Burch. endemic
 Euphorbia arida N.E.Br. endemic
 Euphorbia armata Thunb. accepted as Euphorbia loricata Lam. indigenous
 Euphorbia arrecta N.E.Br. accepted as Euphorbia tenax Burch. indigenous
 Euphorbia artifolia N.E.Br. accepted as Euphorbia foliosa N.E.Br. endemic
 Euphorbia aspericaulis Pax, accepted as Euphorbia muricata Thunb. endemic
 Euphorbia astrispina N.E.Br. accepted as Euphorbia stellispina Haw. indigenous
 Euphorbia astrophora Marx, accepted as Euphorbia brevirama N.E.Br. var. astrophora (Marx) Marx & Van Veldh. endemic
 Euphorbia atrispina N.E.Br. accepted as Euphorbia heptagona L. indigenous
 Euphorbia atrispina N.E.Br. var. viridis A.C.White, R.A.Dyer & B.Sloane, accepted as Euphorbia heptagona L. endemic
 Euphorbia avasmontana Dinter, indigenous
 Euphorbia avasmontana Dinter var. sagittaria (Marloth) A.C.White, R.A.Dyer & B.Sloane, accepted as Euphorbia avasmontana Dinter, indigenous
 Euphorbia bachmannii Pax, accepted as Euphorbia epicyparissias E.Mey. ex Boiss. indigenous
 Euphorbia baliola N.E.Br. accepted as Euphorbia crassipes Marloth 
 Euphorbia barnardii A.C.White, R.A.Dyer & B.Sloane, endemic
 Euphorbia basutica Marloth, accepted as Euphorbia clavarioides Boiss. 
 Euphorbia baumii Pax, accepted as Euphorbia monteiroi Hook.f. 
 Euphorbia bayeri L.C.Leach, accepted as Euphorbia rhombifolia Boiss. endemic
 Euphorbia benguelensis Pax, accepted as Euphorbia trichadenia Pax 
 Euphorbia bergii A.C.White, R.A.Dyer & B.Sloane, accepted as Euphorbia davyi N.E.Br. indigenous
 Euphorbia biglandulosa Willd. accepted as Euphorbia burmannii (Klotzsch ex Garcke) E.Mey. ex Boiss. 
 Euphorbia bolusii N.E.Br. accepted as Euphorbia caput-medusae L. endemic
 Euphorbia brachiata (E.Mey. ex Klotzsch & Garcke) Boiss. accepted as Euphorbia rhombifolia Boiss. indigenous
 Euphorbia brakdamensis N.E.Br. endemic
 Euphorbia braunsii N.E.Br. indigenous
 Euphorbia brevirama N.E.Br. endemic
 Euphorbia brevirama N.E.Br. var. astrophora (Marx) Marx & Van Veldh. endemic
 Euphorbia brevirama N.E.Br. var. brevirama, endemic
 Euphorbia brevirama N.E.Br. var. supraterra Marx & Van Veldh. endemic
 Euphorbia bruynsii L.C.Leach, endemic
 Euphorbia bubalina Boiss. endemic
 Euphorbia bupleurifolia Jacq. endemic
 Euphorbia burmannii (Klotzsch ex Garcke) E.Mey. ex Boiss. indigenous
 Euphorbia burmannii (Klotzsch ex Garcke) E.Mey. ex Boiss. var. karroensis Boiss. accepted as Euphorbia burmannii (Klotzsch ex Garcke) E.Mey. ex Boiss. 
 Euphorbia caerulescens Haw. endemic
 Euphorbia canaliculata Lam. accepted as Euphorbia clava Jacq. indigenous
 Euphorbia canariensis Thunb. accepted as Euphorbia caerulescens Haw. indigenous
 Euphorbia capitosa N.E.Br. accepted as Euphorbia ferox Marloth, indigenous
 Euphorbia caput-medusae L. indigenous
 Euphorbia caput-medusae L. var. geminata Aiton, accepted as Euphorbia caput-medusae L. 
 Euphorbia caput-medusae L. var. major Aiton, accepted as Euphorbia caput-medusae L. 
 Euphorbia caput-medusae L. var. minor Aiton, accepted as Euphorbia caput-medusae L. 
 Euphorbia caterviflora N.E.Br. accepted as Euphorbia rhombifolia Boiss. endemic
 Euphorbia celata R.A.Dyer, endemic
 Euphorbia cereiformis L. endemic
 Euphorbia cervicornis Boiss. accepted as Euphorbia hamata (Haw.) Sweet, indigenous
 Euphorbia chersina N.E.Br. accepted as Euphorbia rhombifolia Boiss. indigenous
 Euphorbia cibdela N.E.Br. accepted as Euphorbia spartaria N.E.Br. indigenous
 Euphorbia clandestina Jacq. endemic
 Euphorbia clava Jacq. endemic
 Euphorbia clavarioides Boiss. indigenous
 Euphorbia clavarioides Boiss. var. truncata (N.E.Br.) A.C.White, R.A.Dyer & B.Sloane, accepted as Euphorbia clavarioides Boiss. endemic
 Euphorbia clavigera N.E.Br. indigenous
 Euphorbia clivicola R.A.Dyer, endemic
 Euphorbia colliculina A.C.White, R.A.Dyer & B.Sloane, endemic
 Euphorbia commelinii DC. accepted as Euphorbia caput-medusae L. 
 Euphorbia commiphoroides Dinter, accepted as Euphorbia guerichiana Pax 
 Euphorbia complexa R.A.Dyer, endemic
 Euphorbia confinalis R.A.Dyer, indigenous
 Euphorbia confinalis R.A.Dyer subsp. confinalis, indigenous
 Euphorbia confluens Nel, accepted as Euphorbia caput-medusae L. endemic
 Euphorbia cooperi N.E.Br. ex A.Berger, indigenous
 Euphorbia cooperi N.E.Br. ex A.Berger var. cooperi, indigenous
 Euphorbia corifolia Lam. accepted as Euphorbia genistoides P.J.Bergius, indigenous
 Euphorbia coronata Thunb. accepted as Euphorbia clava Jacq. 
 Euphorbia corymbosa N.E.Br. accepted as Euphorbia burmannii (Klotzsch ex Garcke) E.Mey. ex Boiss. endemic
 Euphorbia crassipes Marloth, indigenous
 Euphorbia crispa (Haw.) Sweet, accepted as Euphorbia tuberosa L. endemic
 Euphorbia crotonoides Boiss. indigenous
 Euphorbia crotonoides Boiss. subsp. crotonoides, indigenous
 Euphorbia cucumerina Willd. accepted as Euphorbia stellispina Haw. var. stellispina, present
 Euphorbia cumulata R.A.Dyer, endemic
 Euphorbia cupularis Boiss. indigenous
 Euphorbia cuspidata Bernh. ex Krauss, accepted as Euphorbia striata Thunb. indigenous
 Euphorbia cyathophora Murray, not indigenous, naturalised
 Euphorbia cylindrica Marloth ex A.C.White, R.A.Dyer & B.Sloane, endemic
 Euphorbia davyi N.E.Br. indigenous
 Euphorbia decepta N.E.Br. endemic
 Euphorbia decussata E.Mey. ex Boiss. accepted as Euphorbia rhombifolia Boiss. indigenous
 Euphorbia discreta N.E.Br. accepted as Euphorbia flanaganii N.E.Br. indigenous
 Euphorbia dregeana E.Mey. ex Boiss. indigenous
 Euphorbia dumosa E.Mey. ex Boiss. accepted as Euphorbia foliosa N.E.Br. indigenous
 Euphorbia duseimata R.A.Dyer, indigenous
 Euphorbia ecklonii (Klotzsch & Garcke) Baill. endemic
 Euphorbia eendornensis Dinter, accepted as Euphorbia crassipes Marloth 
 Euphorbia einensis G.Will. accepted as Euphorbia angrae N.E.Br. 
 Euphorbia einensis G.Will. var. anemoarenicola G.Will. accepted as Euphorbia angrae N.E.Br. endemic
 Euphorbia elastica Marloth, accepted as Euphorbia dregeana E.Mey. ex Boiss. indigenous
 Euphorbia elliptica Thunb. accepted as Euphorbia silenifolia (Haw.) Sweet, indigenous
 Euphorbia elliptica Thunb. var. undulata Boiss. accepted as Euphorbia silenifolia (Haw.) Sweet 
 Euphorbia enneagona Haw. accepted as Euphorbia mammillaris L. indigenous
 Euphorbia enopla auct. var. dentata A.Berger, accepted as Euphorbia heptagona L. indigenous
 Euphorbia enopla Boiss. accepted as Euphorbia heptagona L. indigenous
 Euphorbia enopla Boiss. var. viridis A.C.White, R.A.Dyer & B.Sloane, accepted as Euphorbia heptagona L. endemic
 Euphorbia enormis N.E.Br. endemic
 Euphorbia ephedroides E.Mey. ex Boiss. indigenous
 Euphorbia ephedroides E.Mey. ex Boiss. var. debilis L.C.Leach, accepted as Euphorbia ephedroides E.Mey. ex Boiss. 
 Euphorbia ephedroides E.Mey. ex Boiss. var. imminuta L.C.Leach & G.Will. accepted as Euphorbia ephedroides E.Mey. ex Boiss. indigenous
 Euphorbia epicyparissias E.Mey. ex Boiss. indigenous
 Euphorbia epicyparissias E.Mey. ex Boiss. var. puberula N.E.Br. accepted as Euphorbia epicyparissias E.Mey. ex Boiss. indigenous
 Euphorbia epicyparissias E.Mey. ex Boiss. var. wahlbergii (Boiss.) N.E.Br. accepted as Euphorbia epicyparissias E.Mey. ex Boiss. indigenous
 Euphorbia ericoides Lam. endemic
 Euphorbia ernestii N.E.Br. accepted as Euphorbia flanaganii N.E.Br. endemic
 Euphorbia erosa Willd. accepted as Euphorbia mammillaris L. indigenous
 Euphorbia erubescens E.Mey. ex Boiss. accepted as Euphorbia kraussiana Bernh. ex Krauss, indigenous
 Euphorbia erythrina Link, endemic
 Euphorbia erythrina Link var. burchellii Boiss. accepted as Euphorbia erythrina Link, indigenous
 Euphorbia erythrina Link var. meyeri N.E.Br. accepted as Euphorbia erythrina Link, endemic
 Euphorbia esculenta Marloth, endemic
 Euphorbia espinosa Pax, indigenous
 Euphorbia eustacei N.E.Br. accepted as Euphorbia loricata Lam. endemic
 Euphorbia evansii Pax, accepted as Euphorbia grandidens Haw. indigenous
 Euphorbia excelsa A.C.White, R.A.Dyer & B.Sloane, endemic
 Euphorbia exilis L.C.Leach, endemic
 Euphorbia falsa N.E.Br. accepted as Euphorbia meloformis Aiton, indigenous
 Euphorbia fasciculata Thunb. endemic
 Euphorbia ferox Marloth, endemic
 Euphorbia filiflora Marloth, endemic
 Euphorbia filiflora Marloth var. nana G.Will. accepted as Euphorbia filiflora Marloth, indigenous
 Euphorbia fimbriata Scop. accepted as Euphorbia mammillaris L. endemic
 Euphorbia flanaganii N.E.Br. endemic
 Euphorbia foliosa N.E.Br. endemic
 Euphorbia forskaolii J.Gay, accepted as Euphorbia austro-occidentalis Thell. 
 Euphorbia fortuita A.C.White, R.A.Dyer & B.Sloane, endemic
 Euphorbia francescae L.C.Leach, accepted as Euphorbia quadrata Nel, indigenous
 Euphorbia franckiana A.Berger, endemic
 Euphorbia franksiae N.E.Br. accepted as Euphorbia flanaganii N.E.Br. indigenous
 Euphorbia franksiae N.E.Br. var. zuluensis A.C.White, R.A.Dyer & B.Sloane, accepted as Euphorbia gerstneriana Bruyns, endemic
 Euphorbia frickiana N.E.Br. accepted as Euphorbia pseudoglobosa Marloth, indigenous
 Euphorbia friedrichiae Dinter, indigenous
 Euphorbia fructus-pini Mill. accepted as Euphorbia caput-medusae L. 
 Euphorbia fructus-pini Mill. var. geminata Sweet, accepted as Euphorbia caput-medusae L. 
 Euphorbia frutescens N.E.Br. accepted as Euphorbia guerichiana Pax 
 Euphorbia fusca Marloth, accepted as Euphorbia crassipes Marloth, indigenous
 Euphorbia galpinii Pax, accepted as Euphorbia transvaalensis Schltr. indigenous
 Euphorbia gamkensis Marx, accepted as Euphorbia decepta N.E.Br. indigenous
 Euphorbia gariepina Boiss. indigenous
 Euphorbia gariepina Boiss. subsp. gariepina, indigenous
 Euphorbia gatbergensis N.E.Br. accepted as Euphorbia flanaganii N.E.Br. endemic
 Euphorbia genistoides P.J.Bergius, endemic
 Euphorbia genistoides P.J.Bergius var. corifolia (Lam.) N.E.Br. accepted as Euphorbia genistoides P.J.Bergius, indigenous
 Euphorbia genistoides P.J.Bergius var. puberula N.E.Br. accepted as Euphorbia genistoides P.J.Bergius, indigenous
 Euphorbia gentilis N.E.Br. endemic
 Euphorbia gentilis N.E.Br. subsp. tanquana L.C.Leach, accepted as Euphorbia gentilis N.E.Br. endemic
 Euphorbia gerstneriana Bruyns, endemic
 Euphorbia gilbertii A.Berger, accepted as Euphorbia stellata Willd. indigenous
 Euphorbia glandularis L.C.Leach & G.Will. accepted as Euphorbia exilis L.C.Leach, endemic
 Euphorbia glanduligera Pax, indigenous
 Euphorbia glaucella Pax, accepted as Euphorbia glanduligera Pax 
 Euphorbia globosa (Haw.) Sims, endemic
 Euphorbia glomerata A.Berger, accepted as Euphorbia globosa (Haw.) Sims, indigenous
 Euphorbia gorgonis A.Berger, accepted as Euphorbia procumbens Mill. endemic
 Euphorbia gossweileri Pax, accepted as Euphorbia trichadenia Pax 
 Euphorbia grandialata R.A.Dyer, endemic
 Euphorbia grandicornis Blanc, indigenous
 Euphorbia grandicornis Blanc subsp. grandicornis, indigenous
 Euphorbia grandicornis Goebel, accepted as Euphorbia grandicornis Blanc 
 Euphorbia grandicornis J.Weiss, accepted as Euphorbia grandicornis Blanc 
 Euphorbia grandidens Haw. indigenous
 Euphorbia graveolens N.E.Br. accepted as Euphorbia restituta N.E.Br. indigenous
 Euphorbia gregaria Marloth, indigenous
 Euphorbia griseola Pax, indigenous
 Euphorbia griseola Pax subsp. griseola, indigenous
 Euphorbia groenewaldii R.A.Dyer, endemic
 Euphorbia gueinzii Boiss. indigenous
 Euphorbia gueinzii Boiss. var. albovillosa (Pax) N.E.Br. accepted as Euphorbia gueinzii Boiss. endemic
 Euphorbia guerichiana Pax, indigenous
 Euphorbia gummifera Boiss. indigenous
 Euphorbia hallii R.A.Dyer, endemic
 Euphorbia hamata (Haw.) Sweet, indigenous
 Euphorbia hastisquama N.E.Br. accepted as Euphorbia rhombifolia Boiss. indigenous
 Euphorbia helioscopia L. not indigenous, naturalised
 Euphorbia heptagona L. endemic
 Euphorbia heptagona L. var. dentata (A.Berger) N.E.Br. accepted as Euphorbia heptagona L. endemic
 Euphorbia heptagona L. var. fulvispina A.Berger, accepted as Euphorbia heptagona L. 
 Euphorbia heptagona L. var. ramosa A.C.White, R.A.Dyer & B.Sloane, accepted as Euphorbia heptagona L. endemic
 Euphorbia heptagona L. var. subsessilis A.C.White, R.A.Dyer & B.Sloane, accepted as Euphorbia heptagona L. endemic
 Euphorbia heptagona L. var. viridis A.C.White, R.A.Dyer & B.Sloane, accepted as Euphorbia heptagona L. endemic
 Euphorbia hereroensis Pax, accepted as Euphorbia phylloclada Boiss. 
 Euphorbia herrei A.C.White, R.A.Dyer & B.Sloane, indigenous
 Euphorbia heterophylla L. not indigenous, naturalised
 Euphorbia hirsuta L. not indigenous, naturalised, invasive
 Euphorbia hirta L. not indigenous, naturalised
 Euphorbia hopetownensis Nel, accepted as Euphorbia crassipes Marloth, endemic
 Euphorbia horrida Boiss. accepted as Euphorbia polygona Haw. indigenous
 Euphorbia horrida Boiss. var. major A.C.White, R.A.Dyer & B.Sloane, accepted as Euphorbia polygona Haw. endemic
 Euphorbia horrida Boiss. var. noorsveldensis A.C.White, R.A.Dyer & B.Sloane, accepted as Euphorbia polygona Haw. endemic
 Euphorbia horrida Boiss. var. striata A.C.White, R.A.Dyer & B.Sloane, accepted as Euphorbia polygona Haw. endemic
 Euphorbia hottentota Marloth, accepted as Euphorbia avasmontana Dinter, indigenous
 Euphorbia huttonae N.E.Br. endemic
 Euphorbia hydnorae E.Mey. ex Boiss. accepted as Euphorbia burmannii (Klotzsch ex Garcke) E.Mey. ex Boiss. indigenous
 Euphorbia hypericifolia L. not indigenous, naturalised
 Euphorbia hypogaea Marloth, endemic
 Euphorbia hystrix Jacq. accepted as Euphorbia loricata Lam. indigenous
 Euphorbia inaequilatera Sond. indigenous
 Euphorbia inaequilatera Sond. var. inaequilatera, indigenous
 Euphorbia inaequilatera Sond. var. perennis N.E.Br. accepted as Euphorbia inaequilatera Sond. indigenous
 Euphorbia indecora N.E.Br. accepted as Euphorbia spartaria N.E.Br. indigenous
 Euphorbia indica Lam. not indigenous, naturalised
 Euphorbia inelegans N.E.Br. accepted as Euphorbia crassipes Marloth, indigenous
 Euphorbia inermis Mill. endemic
 Euphorbia inermis Mill. var. huttonae (N.E.Br.) A.C.White, R.A.Dyer & B.Sloane, accepted as Euphorbia huttonae N.E.Br. endemic
 Euphorbia inermis Mill. var. laniglans N.E.Br. accepted as Euphorbia esculenta Marloth, indigenous
 Euphorbia ingens E.Mey. ex Boiss. indigenous
 Euphorbia inornata N.E.Br. accepted as Euphorbia crassipes Marloth, endemic
 Euphorbia involucrata E.Mey. ex Boiss. accepted as Euphorbia epicyparissias E.Mey. ex Boiss. indigenous
 Euphorbia involucrata E.Mey. ex Boiss. var. megastegia Boiss. accepted as Euphorbia epicyparissias E.Mey. ex Boiss. indigenous
 Euphorbia jansenvillensis Nel, endemic
 Euphorbia juglans Compton, accepted as Euphorbia pseudoglobosa Marloth, endemic
 Euphorbia juttae Dinter, indigenous
 Euphorbia kalaharica Marloth, accepted as Euphorbia avasmontana Dinter, indigenous
 Euphorbia karroensis (Boiss.) N.E.Br. accepted as Euphorbia burmannii (Klotzsch ex Garcke) E.Mey. ex Boiss. indigenous
 Euphorbia knobelii Letty, endemic
 Euphorbia knuthii Pax, indigenous
 Euphorbia knuthii Pax subsp. knuthii, indigenous
 Euphorbia kraussiana Bernh. ex Krauss, endemic
 Euphorbia kraussiana Bernh. ex Krauss var. erubescens (E.Mey. ex Boiss.) N.E.Br. accepted as Euphorbia kraussiana Bernh. ex Krauss, endemic
 Euphorbia kwebensis N.E.Br. accepted as Euphorbia glanduligera Pax 
 Euphorbia lathyris L. not indigenous, naturalised
 Euphorbia latimammillaris Croizat, accepted as Euphorbia mammillaris L. indigenous
 Euphorbia laxiflora Kuntze, accepted as Euphorbia bubalina Boiss. indigenous
 Euphorbia ledienii A.Berger, accepted as Euphorbia caerulescens Haw. indigenous
 Euphorbia ledienii A.Berger var. dregei N.E.Br. accepted as Euphorbia caerulescens Haw. endemic
 Euphorbia leucocephala Lotsy, not indigenous, cultivated, naturalised, invasive
 Euphorbia limpopoana L.C.Leach ex S.Carter, indigenous
 Euphorbia livida E.Mey. ex Boiss. endemic
 Euphorbia lombardensis Nel, accepted as Euphorbia stellata Willd. indigenous
 Euphorbia longibracteata Pax, accepted as Euphorbia monteiroi Hook.f. 
 Euphorbia loricata Lam. endemic
 Euphorbia louwii L.C.Leach, endemic
 Euphorbia lugardiae (N.E.Br.) Bruyns, indigenous
 Euphorbia lumbricalis L.C.Leach, accepted as Euphorbia stapelioides Boiss. endemic
 Euphorbia lydenburgensis Schweick. & Letty, endemic
 Euphorbia macella N.E.Br. accepted as Euphorbia burmannii (Klotzsch ex Garcke) E.Mey. ex Boiss. endemic
 Euphorbia macowani N.E.Br. accepted as Euphorbia caput-medusae L. 
 Euphorbia maculata (L.) Small, not indigenous, naturalised, invasive
 Euphorbia maleolens E.Phillips, indigenous
 Euphorbia malevola L.C.Leach subsp. bechuanica L.C.Leach, accepted as Euphorbia limpopoana L.C.Leach ex S.Carter 
 Euphorbia mammillaris L. endemic
 Euphorbia mammillaris L. var. spinosior A.Berger, accepted as Euphorbia mammillaris L. indigenous
 Euphorbia mammillaris L. var. submammillaris A.Berger, accepted as Euphorbia mammillaris L. indigenous
 Euphorbia marginata Pursh, not indigenous, naturalised
 Euphorbia marientalii Dinter, accepted as Euphorbia braunsii N.E.Br. 
 Euphorbia marlothiana N.E.Br. accepted as Euphorbia caput-medusae L. endemic
 Euphorbia mauritanica L. indigenous
 Euphorbia mauritanica L. var. corallothamnus Dinter ex A.C.White, R.A.Dyer & B.Sloane, accepted as Euphorbia mauritanica L. 
 Euphorbia mauritanica L. var. foetens Dinter ex A.C.White, R.A.Dyer & B.Sloane, accepted as Euphorbia mauritanica L. 
 Euphorbia mauritanica L. var. lignosa A.C.White, R.A.Dyer & B.Sloane, accepted as Euphorbia mauritanica L. indigenous
 Euphorbia mauritanica L. var. minor A.C.White, R.A.Dyer & B.Sloane, accepted as Euphorbia mauritanica L. endemic
 Euphorbia mauritanica L. var. namaquensis N.E.Br. accepted as Euphorbia mauritanica L. indigenous
 Euphorbia medusae Thunb. accepted as Euphorbia caput-medusae L. indigenous
 Euphorbia melanohydrata Nel, indigenous
 Euphorbia melanosticta E.Mey. ex Boiss. accepted as Euphorbia mauritanica L. indigenous
 Euphorbia meloformis Aiton, endemic
 Euphorbia meloformis Aiton subsp. meloformis forma falsa, accepted as Euphorbia meloformis Aiton, endemic
 Euphorbia meloformis Aiton subsp. meloformis var. magna, accepted as Euphorbia meloformis Aiton, indigenous
 Euphorbia meloformis Aiton subsp. valida (N.E.Br.) G.D.Rowley, accepted as Euphorbia meloformis Aiton, endemic
 Euphorbia meloformis Aiton var. pomiformis (Thunb.) Marloth, accepted as Euphorbia meloformis Aiton, indigenous
 Euphorbia meloformis Aiton var. prolifera Frick, accepted as Euphorbia meloformis Aiton, indigenous
 Euphorbia meyeri Boiss. accepted as Euphorbia erythrina Link, indigenous
 Euphorbia meyeri Nel, accepted as Euphorbia filiflora Marloth, indigenous
 Euphorbia micracantha Boiss. accepted as Euphorbia stellata Willd. endemic
 Euphorbia mira L.C.Leach, accepted as Euphorbia silenifolia (Haw.) Sweet, endemic
 Euphorbia miscella L.C.Leach, accepted as Euphorbia celata R.A.Dyer, indigenous
 Euphorbia mixta N.E.Br. accepted as Euphorbia tenax Burch. endemic
 Euphorbia monteiroi Hook.f. indigenous
 Euphorbia monteiroi Hook.f. subsp. ramosa L.C.Leach, indigenous
 Euphorbia morinii A.Berger, accepted as Euphorbia heptagona L. indigenous
 Euphorbia mossambicensis (Klotzsch & Garcke) Boiss. indigenous
 Euphorbia muirii N.E.Br. accepted as Euphorbia caput-medusae L. endemic
 Euphorbia multiceps A.Berger, endemic
 Euphorbia multifida N.E.Br. endemic
 Euphorbia multifolia A.C.White, R.A.Dyer & B.Sloane, endemic
 Euphorbia multiramosa Nel, accepted as Euphorbia namaquensis N.E.Br. present
 Euphorbia mundii N.E.Br. accepted as Euphorbia rhombifolia Boiss. indigenous
 Euphorbia muraltioides N.E.Br. endemic
 Euphorbia muricata Thunb. endemic
 Euphorbia namaquensis N.E.Br. indigenous
 Euphorbia natalensis Bernh. ex Krauss, indigenous
 Euphorbia nelii A.C.White, R.A.Dyer & B.Sloane, accepted as Euphorbia filiflora Marloth, indigenous
 Euphorbia nelsii Pax, accepted as Euphorbia inaequilatera Sond. 
 Euphorbia neopolycnemoides Pax & K.Hoffm. indigenous
 Euphorbia nesemannii R.A.Dyer, endemic
 Euphorbia nutans Lag. not indigenous, naturalised
 Euphorbia obesa Hook.f. endemic
 Euphorbia obesa Hook.f. subsp. symmetrica (A.C.White, R.A.Dyer & B.Sloane) G.D.Rowley, accepted as Euphorbia obesa Hook.f. indigenous
 Euphorbia ornithopus Jacq. accepted as Euphorbia tridentata Lam. var. ornithopus (Jacq.) Van Veldh. & Lawant, endemic
 Euphorbia ovata (E.Mey. ex Klotzsch & Garcke) Boiss. accepted as Euphorbia sclerophylla Boiss. indigenous
 Euphorbia oxystegia Boiss. endemic
 Euphorbia parvifolia E.Mey. ex Boiss. accepted as Euphorbia inaequilatera Sond. indigenous
 Euphorbia parvifolia E.Mey. ex Boiss. var. laxa Boiss. accepted as Euphorbia inaequilatera Sond. 
 Euphorbia passa N.E.Br. accepted as Euphorbia flanaganii N.E.Br. indigenous
 Euphorbia patula Mill. endemic
 Euphorbia paxiana Dinter, accepted as Euphorbia mauritanica L. 
 Euphorbia pedemontana L.C.Leach, endemic
 Euphorbia peltigera E.Mey. ex Boiss. accepted as Euphorbia hamata (Haw.) Sweet, indigenous
 Euphorbia pentagona Haw. endemic
 Euphorbia pentops Marloth ex A.C.White, R.A.Dyer & B.Sloane, endemic
 Euphorbia peplus L. not indigenous, naturalised
 Euphorbia perangusta R.A.Dyer, endemic
 Euphorbia perpera N.E.Br. accepted as Euphorbia rhombifolia Boiss. endemic
 Euphorbia persistens R.A.Dyer, accepted as Euphorbia clavigera N.E.Br. indigenous
 Euphorbia pfeilii Pax, accepted as Euphorbia glanduligera Pax, indigenous
 Euphorbia phylloclada Boiss. indigenous
 Euphorbia phymatoclada Boiss. accepted as Euphorbia burmannii (Klotzsch ex Garcke) E.Mey. ex Boiss. indigenous
 Euphorbia pillansii N.E.Br. endemic
 Euphorbia pillansii N.E.Br. var. albovirens A.C.White, R.A.Dyer & B.Sloane, accepted as Euphorbia pillansii N.E.Br. endemic
 Euphorbia pillansii N.E.Br. var. ramosissima A.C.White, R.A.Dyer & B.Sloane, accepted as Euphorbia pillansii N.E.Br. endemic
 Euphorbia pistiifolia Boiss. accepted as Euphorbia ecklonii (Klotzsch & Garcke) Baill. indigenous
 Euphorbia planiceps A.C.White, R.A.Dyer & B.Sloane, accepted as Euphorbia wilmaniae Marloth, endemic
 Euphorbia platymammillaris Croizat, accepted as Euphorbia mammillaris L. indigenous
 Euphorbia polycephala Marloth, endemic
 Euphorbia polygona Haw. endemic
 Euphorbia polygona Haw. var. alba D.H.Schnabel, accepted as Euphorbia polygona Haw. endemic
 Euphorbia polygona Haw. var. ambigua D.H.Schnabel, accepted as Euphorbia polygona Haw. endemic
 Euphorbia polygona Haw. var. exilis Schnabel, accepted as Euphorbia polygona Haw. indigenous
 Euphorbia polygona Haw. var. horrida (Boiss.) D.H.Schnabel forma alba, accepted as Euphorbia polygona Haw. indigenous
 Euphorbia polygona Haw. var. minor D.H.Schnabel, accepted as Euphorbia polygona Haw. endemic
 Euphorbia polygona Haw. var. nivea Schnabel, accepted as Euphorbia polygona Haw. indigenous
 Euphorbia pomiformis Thunb. accepted as Euphorbia meloformis Aiton, indigenous
 Euphorbia procumbens Meerb. accepted as Euphorbia stellata Willd. 
 Euphorbia procumbens Mill. endemic
 Euphorbia prostrata Aiton, not indigenous, naturalised
 Euphorbia proteifolia Boiss. accepted as Euphorbia bupleurifolia Jacq. indigenous
 Euphorbia pseudocactus A.Berger, endemic
 Euphorbia pseudoduseimata A.C.White, R.A.Dyer & B.Sloane, accepted as Euphorbia davyi N.E.Br. indigenous
 Euphorbia pseudoglobosa Marloth, endemic
 Euphorbia pseudohypogaea Dinter, accepted as Euphorbia davyi N.E.Br. 
 Euphorbia pseudotuberosa Pax, indigenous
 Euphorbia pubiglans N.E.Br. accepted as Euphorbia clava Jacq. endemic
 Euphorbia pugniformis Boiss. accepted as Euphorbia procumbens Mill. endemic
 Euphorbia pulcherrima Willd. ex Klotzsch, not indigenous, naturalised
 Euphorbia pulvinata Marloth, indigenous
 Euphorbia pyriformis N.E.Br. accepted as Euphorbia meloformis Aiton, indigenous
 Euphorbia quadrata Nel, endemic
 Euphorbia racemosa E.Mey. ex Boiss. accepted as Euphorbia spartaria N.E.Br. indigenous
 Euphorbia radiata E.Mey. ex Boiss. accepted as Euphorbia restituta N.E.Br. 
 Euphorbia radiata Thunb. accepted as Euphorbia stellata Willd. indigenous
 Euphorbia radyeri Bruyns, endemic
 Euphorbia ramiglans N.E.Br. accepted as Euphorbia caput-medusae L. endemic
 Euphorbia rangeana Dinter, accepted as Euphorbia braunsii N.E.Br. 
 Euphorbia rectirama N.E.Br. accepted as Euphorbia spartaria N.E.Br. indigenous
 Euphorbia restituta N.E.Br. endemic
 Euphorbia restricta R.A.Dyer, endemic
 Euphorbia rhombifolia Boiss. indigenous
 Euphorbia rhombifolia Boiss. var. cymosa N.E.Br. accepted as Euphorbia tenax Burch. indigenous
 Euphorbia rhombifolia Boiss. var. laxa N.E.Br. accepted as Euphorbia spartaria N.E.Br. indigenous
 Euphorbia rhombifolia Boiss. var. triceps N.E.Br. accepted as Euphorbia spartaria N.E.Br. indigenous
 Euphorbia rowlandii R.A.Dyer, indigenous
 Euphorbia rudis N.E.Br. accepted as Euphorbia braunsii N.E.Br. indigenous
 Euphorbia rudolfii N.E.Br. accepted as Euphorbia rhombifolia Boiss. indigenous
 Euphorbia ruscifolia (Boiss.) N.E.Br. endemic
 Euphorbia sagittaria Marloth, accepted as Euphorbia avasmontana Dinter, indigenous
 Euphorbia sanguinea Hochst. & Steud. ex Boiss. var. natalensis Boiss. accepted as Euphorbia inaequilatera Sond. indigenous
 Euphorbia sanguinea Hochst. & Steud. ex Boiss. var. setigera E.Mey. ex Boiss. accepted as Euphorbia inaequilatera Sond. indigenous
 Euphorbia sarcostemmatoides Dinter, accepted as Euphorbia mauritanica L. 
 Euphorbia schinzii Pax, indigenous
 Euphorbia schoenlandii Pax, endemic
 Euphorbia sclerophylla Boiss. endemic
 Euphorbia sclerophylla Boiss. var. myrtifolia E.Mey. ex Boiss. accepted as Euphorbia sclerophylla Boiss. indigenous
 Euphorbia sclerophylla Boiss. var. puberula N.E.Br. accepted as Euphorbia sclerophylla Boiss. indigenous
 Euphorbia sclerophylla Boiss. var. ruscifolia Boiss. accepted as Euphorbia ruscifolia (Boiss.) N.E.Br. indigenous
 Euphorbia scopoliana Steud. accepted as Euphorbia mammillaris L. indigenous
 Euphorbia sekukuniensis R.A.Dyer, endemic
 Euphorbia serpens Kunth, not indigenous, naturalised
 Euphorbia serpiformis Boiss. accepted as Euphorbia tenax Burch. indigenous
 Euphorbia serrata L. not indigenous, naturalised
 Euphorbia silenifolia (Haw.) Sweet, endemic
 Euphorbia siliciicola Dinter, accepted as Euphorbia juttae Dinter 
 Euphorbia similis A.Berger, accepted as Euphorbia ingens E.Mey. ex Boiss. indigenous
 Euphorbia spartaria N.E.Br. indigenous
 Euphorbia spicata E.Mey. ex Boiss. accepted as Euphorbia muricata Thunb. endemic
 Euphorbia spinea N.E.Br. indigenous
 Euphorbia squarrosa Haw. accepted as Euphorbia stellata Willd. endemic
 Euphorbia stapelioides Boiss. indigenous
 Euphorbia stegmatica Nel, accepted as Euphorbia quadrata Nel, indigenous
 Euphorbia stellata Willd. endemic
 Euphorbia stellispina Haw. endemic
 Euphorbia stellispina Haw. var. astrispina (N.E.Br.) A.C.White, R.A.Dyer & B.Sloane, accepted as Euphorbia stellispina Haw. endemic
 Euphorbia stolonifera Marloth ex A.C.White, R.A.Dyer & B.Sloane, endemic
 Euphorbia striata Thunb. indigenous
 Euphorbia striata Thunb. var. brachyphylla Boiss. accepted as Euphorbia sclerophylla Boiss. indigenous
 Euphorbia striata Thunb. var. cuspidata Boiss. accepted as Euphorbia striata Thunb. endemic
 Euphorbia subfalcata Hiern, accepted as Euphorbia trichadenia Pax 
 Euphorbia submammillaris (A.Berger) A.Berger, indigenous
 Euphorbia suffulta Bruyns, endemic
 Euphorbia superans Nel ex Herre, accepted as Euphorbia huttonae N.E.Br. present
 Euphorbia suppressa Marx, accepted as Euphorbia decepta N.E.Br. indigenous
 Euphorbia susannae Marloth, endemic
 Euphorbia symmetrica A.C.White, R.A.Dyer & B.Sloane, accepted as Euphorbia obesa Hook.f. indigenous
 Euphorbia tenax Burch. endemic
 Euphorbia terracina L. not indigenous, naturalised, invasive
 Euphorbia tessellata (Haw.) Sweet, accepted as Euphorbia caput-medusae L. 
 Euphorbia tetragona Haw. endemic
 Euphorbia tettensis Klotzsch, indigenous
 Euphorbia tirucalli L. indigenous
 Euphorbia tithymaloides L. subsp. smallii (Millsp.) V.W.Steinm. not indigenous, naturalised
 Euphorbia tortirama R.A.Dyer, endemic
 Euphorbia transvaalensis Schltr. indigenous
 Euphorbia triangularis Desf. ex A.Berger, indigenous
 Euphorbia trichadenia Pax, indigenous
 Euphorbia trichadenia Pax var. gibbsiae N.E.Br. accepted as Euphorbia trichadenia Pax 
 Euphorbia tridentata Lam. endemic
 Euphorbia tridentata Lam. var. ornithopus (Jacq.) Van Veldh. & Lawant, endemic
 Euphorbia tridentata Lam. var. tridentata, endemic
 Euphorbia truncata N.E.Br. accepted as Euphorbia clavarioides Boiss. indigenous
 Euphorbia tuberculata Jacq. accepted as Euphorbia caput-medusae L. indigenous
 Euphorbia tuberculata Jacq. var. macowani (N.E.Br.) A.C.White, R.A.Dyer & B.Sloane, accepted as Euphorbia caput-medusae L. endemic
 Euphorbia tuberculatoides N.E.Br. accepted as Euphorbia caput-medusae L. indigenous
 Euphorbia tuberosa L. endemic
 Euphorbia tubiglans Marloth ex R.A.Dyer, accepted as Euphorbia jansenvillensis Nel, endemic
 Euphorbia tugelensis N.E.Br. endemic
 Euphorbia umfoloziensis Peckover, endemic
 Euphorbia uncinata DC. accepted as Euphorbia stellata Willd. indigenous
 Euphorbia vaalputsiana L.C.Leach, accepted as Euphorbia gentilis N.E.Br. endemic
 Euphorbia valida N.E.Br. accepted as Euphorbia meloformis Aiton, indigenous
 Euphorbia vandermerwei R.A.Dyer, endemic
 Euphorbia venenata Marloth, accepted as Euphorbia avasmontana Dinter 
 Euphorbia versicolores G.Will. accepted as Euphorbia filiflora Marloth, endemic
 Euphorbia virosa Willd. indigenous
 Euphorbia virosa Willd. subsp. virosa, indigenous
 Euphorbia virosa Willd. var. caerulescens (Haw.) A.Berger, accepted as Euphorbia caerulescens Haw. indigenous
 Euphorbia volkmanniae Dinter, accepted as Euphorbia avasmontana Dinter 
 Euphorbia wahlbergii Boiss. accepted as Euphorbia epicyparissias E.Mey. ex Boiss. indigenous
 Euphorbia waterbergensis R.A.Dyer, endemic
 Euphorbia wilmaniae Marloth, endemic
 Euphorbia woodii N.E.Br. accepted as Euphorbia flanaganii N.E.Br. endemic
 Euphorbia x bothae Lotsy & Goddijn, endemic
 Euphorbia x curvirama R.A.Dyer, endemic
 Euphorbia x inconstantia  R.A.Dyer, endemic
 Euphorbia zambesiana Benth. indigenous
 Euphorbia zambesiana Benth. var. zambesiana, indigenous
 Euphorbia zoutpansbergensis R.A.Dyer, endemic

Excoecaria 
Genus Excoecaria:
 Excoecaria simii (Kuntze) Pax, endemic

Galarhoeus 
Genus Galarhoeus:
 Galarhoeus genistoides (P.J.Bergius) Haw. accepted as Euphorbia genistoides P.J.Bergius, indigenous

Homalanthus 
Genus Homalanthus:
 Homalanthus populifolius Graham, not indigenous, naturalised, invasive

Jatropha 
Genus Jatropha:
 Jatropha capensis (L.f.) Sond. endemic
 Jatropha curcas L. not indigenous, cultivated, naturalised, invasive
 Jatropha erythropoda Pax & K.Hoffm. indigenous
 Jatropha gossypiifolia L. not indigenous, naturalised
 Jatropha gossypiifolia L. var. elegans (Pohl) Mull.Arg. not indigenous, naturalised, invasive
 Jatropha hirsuta Hochst. indigenous
 Jatropha hirsuta Hochst. var. glabrescens (Pax & K.Hoffm.) Prain, endemic
 Jatropha hirsuta Hochst. var. hirsuta, endemic
 Jatropha hirsuta Hochst. var. oblongifolia Prain, indigenous
 Jatropha lagarinthoides Sond. endemic
 Jatropha latifolia Pax, indigenous
 Jatropha latifolia Pax var. angustata Prain, endemic
 Jatropha latifolia Pax var. latifolia, endemic
 Jatropha latifolia Pax var. swazica Prain, indigenous
 Jatropha multifida L. not indigenous, naturalised
 Jatropha natalensis Mull.Arg. endemic
 Jatropha orangeana Dinter ex P.G.Mey. indigenous
 Jatropha podagrica Hook. not indigenous, naturalised
 Jatropha pseudoglandulifera Pax, accepted as Jatropha spicata Pax 
 Jatropha schlechteri Pax, indigenous
 Jatropha schlechteri Pax subsp. schlechteri, indigenous
 Jatropha schlechteri Pax subsp. setifera (Hutch.) Radcl.-Sm. indigenous
 Jatropha spicata Pax, indigenous
 Jatropha variifolia Pax, indigenous
 Jatropha woodii Kuntze, endemic
 Jatropha zeyheri Sond. indigenous
 Jatropha zeyheri Sond. var. platyphylla Pax, accepted as Jatropha zeyheri Sond. present
 Jatropha zeyheri Sond. var. subsimplex Prain, accepted as Jatropha zeyheri Sond. present

Leidesia 
Genus Leidesia:
 Leidesia procumbens (L.) Prain, indigenous

Macaranga 
Genus Macaranga:
 Macaranga capensis (Baill.) Benth. ex Sim, indigenous
 Macaranga capensis (Baill.) Benth. ex Sim var. capensis, indigenous

Manihot 
Genus Manihot:
 Manihot dichotoma Ule, not indigenous, naturalised
 Manihot dulcis (J.F.Gmel.) Pax, accepted as Manihot esculenta Crantz, not indigenous, naturalised
 Manihot esculenta Crantz, not indigenous, cultivated, naturalised
 Manihot glaziovii Mull.Arg. not indigenous, naturalised

Medusea 
Genus Medusea:
 Medusea fructus-pini (Mill.) Haw. accepted as Euphorbia caput-medusae L. 
 Medusea globosa (Haw.) Klotzsch & Garcke, accepted as Euphorbia globosa (Haw.) Sims, indigenous
 Medusea hamata (Haw.) Klotzsch & Garcke, accepted as Euphorbia hamata (Haw.) Sweet, indigenous
 Medusea major Haw. accepted as Euphorbia caput-medusae L. 
 Medusea patula (Mill.) Klotzsch & Garcke, accepted as Euphorbia patula Mill. indigenous
 Medusea procumbens (Mill.) Haw. accepted as Euphorbia procumbens Mill. indigenous
 Medusea tessellata Haw. accepted as Euphorbia caput-medusae L. 
 Medusea tridentata (Lam.) Klotzsch & Garcke, accepted as Euphorbia tridentata Lam. indigenous
 Medusea tuberculata (Jacq.) Klotzsch & Garcke, accepted as Euphorbia caput-medusae L.

Mercurialis 
Genus Mercurialis:
 Mercurialis annua L. not indigenous, naturalised, invasive

Micrococca 
Genus Micrococca:
 Micrococca capensis (Baill.) Prain, indigenous

Monadenium 
Genus Monadenium:
 Monadenium lugardiae N.E.Br. accepted as Euphorbia lugardiae (N.E.Br.) Bruyns, indigenous

Pedilanthus 
Genus Pedilanthus:
 Pedilanthus smallii Millsp. accepted as Euphorbia tithymaloides L. subsp. smallii (Millsp.) V.W.Steinm. not indigenous, naturalised
 Pedilanthus tithymaloides (L.) A.Poit. subsp. smallii (Millsp.) Dressler, accepted as Euphorbia tithymaloides L. subsp. smallii (Millsp.) V.W.Steinm. not indigenous, naturalised

Pterococcus 
Genus Pterococcus:
 Pterococcus africanus (Sond.) Pax & K.Hoffm. accepted as Plukenetia africana Sond. present

Ricinus 
Genus Ricinus:
 Ricinus communis L. accepted as Ricinus communis L. var. communis, not indigenous, naturalised, invasive
 Ricinus communis L. var. communis, not indigenous, cultivated, naturalised, invasive

Sapium 
Genus Sapium:
 Sapium ellipticum (Hochst.) Pax, accepted as Shirakiopsis elliptica (Hochst.) Esser, present
 Sapium integerrimum (Hochst.) J.Leonard, accepted as Sclerocroton integerrimus Hochst. present

Schinziophyton 
Genus Schinziophyton:
 Schinziophyton rautanenii (Schinz) Radcl.-Sm. indigenous

Sclerocroton 
Genus Sclerocroton:
 Sclerocroton integerrimus Hochst. indigenous

Seidelia 
Genus Seidelia:
 Seidelia pumila (Sond.) Baill. endemic
 Seidelia triandra (E.Mey.) Pax, indigenous

Shirakiopsis 
Genus Shirakiopsis:
 Shirakiopsis elliptica (Hochst.) Esser, indigenous

Spirostachys 
Genus Spirostachys:
 Spirostachys africana Sond. indigenous

Suregada 
Genus Suregada:
 Suregada africana (Sond.) Kuntze, indigenous
 Suregada procera (Prain) Croizat, indigenous
 Suregada zanzibariensis Baill. indigenous

Synadenium 
Genus Synadenium:
 Synadenium cupulare (Boiss.) L.C.Wheeler ex A.C.White, R.A.Dyer & B.Sloane, accepted as Euphorbia cupularis Boiss. indigenous

Tithymalus 
Genus Tithymalus:
 Tithymalus apiculatus Klotzsch & Garcke, accepted as Euphorbia erythrina Link, indigenous
 Tithymalus attenuatus Klotzsch & Garcke, accepted as Euphorbia silenifolia (Haw.) Sweet, indigenous
 Tithymalus bergii Klotzsch & Garcke, accepted as Euphorbia silenifolia (Haw.) Sweet, indigenous
 Tithymalus brachypus Klotzsch & Garcke, accepted as Euphorbia mauritanica L. indigenous
 Tithymalus capensis Klotzsch & Garcke, accepted as Euphorbia natalensis Bernh. ex Krauss, indigenous
 Tithymalus confertus Klotzsch & Garcke, accepted as Euphorbia erythrina Link 
 Tithymalus crispus Haw. accepted as Euphorbia tuberosa L. indigenous
 Tithymalus ecklonii Klotzsch & Garcke, accepted as Euphorbia ecklonii (Klotzsch & Garcke) Baill. indigenous
 Tithymalus ellipticus (Thunb.) Klotzsch & Garcke, accepted as Euphorbia silenifolia (Haw.) Sweet, indigenous
 Tithymalus epicyparissias E.Mey. ex Klotzsch & Garcke, accepted as Euphorbia epicyparissias E.Mey. ex Boiss. indigenous
 Tithymalus erythrinus (Link) Klotzsch & Garcke, accepted as Euphorbia erythrina Link, indigenous
 Tithymalus foliosus Klotzsch & Garcke, accepted as Euphorbia foliosa N.E.Br. indigenous
 Tithymalus genistoides (P.J.Bergius) Klotzsch & Garcke, accepted as Euphorbia genistoides P.J.Bergius, indigenous
 Tithymalus involucratus Klotzsch & Garcke, accepted as Euphorbia epicyparissias E.Mey. ex Boiss. indigenous
 Tithymalus longipetiolatus Klotzsch & Garcke, accepted as Euphorbia silenifolia (Haw.) Sweet, indigenous
 Tithymalus mauritanicus (L.) Haw. accepted as Euphorbia mauritanica L. indigenous
 Tithymalus meyeri Klotzsch & Garcke, accepted as Euphorbia kraussiana Bernh. ex Krauss, indigenous
 Tithymalus multicaulis Klotzsch & Garcke, accepted as Euphorbia sclerophylla Boiss. indigenous
 Tithymalus ovatus E.Mey. ex Klotzsch & Garcke, accepted as Euphorbia sclerophylla Boiss. indigenous
 Tithymalus revolutus Klotzsch & Garcke, accepted as Euphorbia genistoides P.J.Bergius, indigenous
 Tithymalus straitus (Thunb.) Klotzsch & Garcke, accepted as Euphorbia striata Thunb. indigenous
 Tithymalus truncatus Klotzsch & Garcke, accepted as Euphorbia kraussiana Bernh. ex Krauss, indigenous
 Tithymalus tuberosus (L.) Hill, accepted as Euphorbia tuberosa L. indigenous
 Tithymalus zeyheri Klotzsch & Garcke, accepted as Euphorbia mauritanica L. indigenous

Tragia 
Genus Tragia:
 Tragia capensis Thunb. indigenous
 Tragia collina Prain, endemic
 Tragia cordata (Harv.) Burtt Davy, accepted as Tragia capensis Thunb. indigenous
 Tragia dioica Sond. indigenous
 Tragia glabrata (Mull.Arg.) Pax & K.Hoffm. indigenous
 Tragia glabrata (Mull.Arg.) Pax & K.Hoffm. var. glabrata, indigenous
 Tragia incisifolia Prain, indigenous
 Tragia kirkiana Mull.Arg. indigenous
 Tragia meyeriana Mull.Arg. indigenous
 Tragia minor Sond. indigenous
 Tragia okanyua Pax, indigenous
 Tragia physocarpa Prain, indigenous
 Tragia prionoides Radcl.-Sm. indigenous
 Tragia rogersii Prain, endemic
 Tragia rupestris Sond. indigenous
 Tragia sonderi Prain, indigenous
 Tragia wahlbergiana Prain, endemic

Tragiella 
Genus Tragiella:
 Tragiella natalensis (Sond.) Pax & K.Hoffm. indigenous

Treisia 
Genus Treisia:
 Treisia hystrix (Jacq.) Haw. accepted as Euphorbia loricata Lam. indigenous
 Treisia tuberculata Haw. accepted as Euphorbia clava Jacq.

Vernicia 
Genus Vernicia:
 Vernicia fordii (Hemsl.) Airy Shaw, not indigenous, naturalised
 Vernicia montana Lour. not indigenous, naturalised

References

South African plant biodiversity lists
Euphorbiaceae